Fosses is a commune in the Val-d'Oise department in Île-de-France in northern France.

Fosses may also refer to:

Places
 Fosses-la-Ville, Namur, Belgium
 Nayemont-les-Fosses, Vosges, France
 Fosses-et-Baleyssac, south-western France
 Ruisseau de Fosses,  tributary of the river Sambre in Belgium

See also
 Foss (disambiguation)
 Fosse (disambiguation)
 Fossa (disambiguation)